The Burrprint (The Movie 3D) is a mixtape by American rapper Gucci Mane and hosted by DJ Drama. It was released on October 9, 2009. It is the third and final installment in his "The Movie" series, and the first installment in his "Burrprint" series of mixtapes. The album features notable artists Bun B, Rocko, OJ da Juiceman, Waka Flocka Flame, Shawty Redd and Kandi Burruss. Burrrprint: 3D peaked at number 18 on the Billboard Top Rap Album chart and number 36 on the Billboard Top Independent Albums chart. According to an interview with MTV News, DJ Drama stated that the mixtape originated from the desire to produce an improved version of Gucci Mane's previous mixtape, "The Movie: Part 2", which according to him "didn't do what we felt it should've done".

Critical reception

The mixtape was met with positive reviews from music critics. Tom Breihan of Pitchfork Media noted "He's found his audience by elevating ignorance to expertly absurdist art, thus making his 2009 a worthy successor to Cam'ron's 2004 or Lil Wayne's 2005. He's been on a very, very serious roll."

Track listing

Charts

References

2009 mixtape albums
Gucci Mane albums
Albums produced by Drumma Boy
Albums produced by Zaytoven
Albums produced by Scott Storch
Albums produced by Jazze Pha
Albums produced by Shawty Redd
Albums produced by Fatboi
DJ Drama albums
E1 Music albums